Nkau is a community council located in the Mohale's Hoek District of Lesotho. Its population in 2006 was 9,092.

Villages
The community of Nkau includes the villages of Ha 'Muso, Ha Boroko, Ha Chalotsane, Ha Emile, Ha Jopo, Ha Kahlolo, Ha Kajeng, Ha Kepa, Ha Kojoana, Ha Lechesa, Ha Lenyatsa, Ha Liau, Ha Madodene, Ha Makhetha, Ha Malatsi, Ha Masilo, Ha Matsa, Ha Moahloli, Ha Moepholi, Ha Mohlokoane, Ha Mokhele, Ha Mokone, Ha Mokotso, Ha Molele, Ha Moleleki, Ha Morema, Ha Motolopo, Ha Motsie, Ha Mphuthela, Ha Mpusi, Ha Nkopane, Ha Nonyane, Ha Ntoahae, Ha Ntoane, Ha Phafoli, Ha Pholo, Ha Rabele, Ha Rankhoba, Ha Romane, Ha Seeqela, Ha Selone, Ha Seqhoke, Ha Setlhotlelo, Ha Setone, Ha Thiba-li-eme, Ha Thuhloane, Ha Tlelaka, Ha Tšolo, Hloahloeng, Khamolane, Khilibiting, Khilibiting (Ha Ralebona), Khohlong, Khubetsoana, Leribe, Lilibaneng, Lithabaneng, Lithakong, Mafosieng, Makokong, Maqolong, Matlapeng, Matšabeng, Motse-Mocha, Mphoko, Pitsaneng, Qabanyane (Ha Malinyane), Sehaula and Thabong.

References

External links
 Google map of community villages

Populated places in Mohale's Hoek District